Ma Yuanxiang (1897 – 1953; ,) was a Chinese Muslim General and a member of the Ma Clique.

He was related to the Ma family clique. He served for many years in Qinghai in the National Revolutionary Army. Ma fought against the Japanese in the Second Sino-Japanese War under the command of General Ma Biao and was wounded in action at the Battle of Huaiyang where the Japanese were defeated.

After pretending to surrender to the People's Liberation Army in 1949, he broke loose in 1950 and started the insurgency. He became a subordinate officer to Ma Liang, he Commanded the 102nd Detachment, South-western Nationalist Underground Army. Ma Yuanxiang and Ma Liang (general) wreaked havoc on the Communist forces during the Kuomintang Islamic Insurgency in China (1950–1958). In 1953, Mao Zedong was compelled to take radical action against them. He was then killed by communist forces in battle in 1953.

References

Hui people
1897 births
1953 deaths
National Revolutionary Army generals
Warlords in Republican China
Chinese anti-communists
Ma clique